Edward Miguel Paredes Cruz (born September 30, 1986) is a Dominican professional baseball pitcher who is a free agent. He played in Major League Baseball (MLB) for the Los Angeles Dodgers in 2017 and 2018.

Career

Seattle Mariners
Paredes was signed as a non-drafted free agent by the Seattle Mariners on May 12, 2005. He played in their farm system through 2011, reaching as high as Triple-A for the Tacoma Rainers. He was a post-season All Star for the Everett AquaSox of the Northwest League in 2007. He became a free agent after the 2011 season.

Cleveland Indians
Paredes pitched in the Dominican Winter League in 2011 and 2012, but did not rejoin affiliated baseball until he signed as a minor league free agent by the Cleveland Indians in January 2013. He had an 8.10 ERA in six appearances for the Akron Aeros of the Eastern League before he was released on April 19, 2013.

York Revolution
He spent the 2014 season with the York Revolution of the Atlantic League of Professional Baseball. He was 3-3 with a 2.70 ERA.

Los Angeles Angels
On November 20, 2015, he signed with the Los Angeles Angels and played for the Arkansas Travelers in 2016, for whom he was 2-2 with 2 saves and a 2.27 ERA and 53 strikeouts in 43.2 innings, as he limited batters to a .167 batting average. He was a Mid-Season Texas League All Star.

Los Angeles Dodgers
He signed with the Detroit Tigers on November 19, 2016, but was selected by the Los Angeles Dodgers in the minor league portion of the Rule 5 draft on December 8. He began the season with AA Tulsa for whom he was 0-2 with a save and a 2.81 ERA and 45 strikeouts in 32 innings, and was then promoted to AAA Oklahoma City for whom he was 2-1 with an 0.75 ERA and an 0.83 WHIP and 21 strikeouts in 12 innings. He was a Mid-Season Texas League All Star. On July 24, 2017, he was called up to the majors with the Dodgers. He made his major league debut that night against the Minnesota Twins and pitched a scoreless inning to record the win. He appeared in 10 games for the Dodgers in 2017, was 1-0 with a 3.24 ERA, striking out 11 and allowing eight hits and three runs in 8 innings, with an 0.96 WHIP .

Paredes was designated for assignment on July 11, 2018. He pitched in 15 games for the Dodgers in 2018, was 2-0 with a 5.87 ERA and 8 strikeouts in 7 innings, and was 3-2 with 2 saves and a 3.79 ERA with 41 strikeouts in 35.2 innings in 36 games for Oklahoma City. Paredes elected free agency on October 15, 2018.

Through 2018, in the minor leagues Paredes was during the course of his career 38-40 with 26 saves and a 4.28 ERA, and averaged 4.4 walks and 8.6 strikeouts per 9 innings.  In the major leagues, he was 3-0 with a 4.50 ERA, and averaged 1.1 walks and 10.7 strikeouts per 9 innings.

Philadelphia Phillies
On January 11, 2019, Paredes signed a minor league deal with the Philadelphia Phillies. He was released on March 21, 2019.

Los Angeles Dodgers (second stint)
On April 8, 2019, Paredes signed a minor league deal with the Los Angeles Dodgers.

Guerreros de Oaxaca
On July 24, 2019, Paredes was loaned to the Guerreros de Oaxaca of the Mexican League. He became a free agent following the season.

York Revolution (second stint)
On March 3, 2020, Paredes signed with the York Revolution of the Atlantic League of Professional Baseball. He did not play a game for the team because of the cancellation of the 2020 ALPB season due to the COVID-19 pandemic and became a free agent after the year. On April 19, 2021, Paredes re-signed with the team for the 2021 season. He became a free agent following the season.

Hamilton Cardinals
On February 22, 2022, Paredes signed with the Hamilton Cardinals of the Intercounty Baseball League.

References

External links

1986 births
Águilas Cibaeñas players
Akron Aeros players
Arkansas Travelers players
Dominican Republic expatriate baseball players in Mexico
Dominican Republic expatriate baseball players in the United States
Dominican Summer League Mariners players
Everett AquaSox players
Guerreros de Oaxaca players
High Desert Mavericks players
Jackson Generals (Southern League) players
Leones del Escogido players
Living people
Los Angeles Dodgers players
Major League Baseball players from the Dominican Republic
Major League Baseball pitchers
Oklahoma City Dodgers players
Tacoma Rainiers players
Tulsa Drillers players
West Tennessee Diamond Jaxx players
Wisconsin Timber Rattlers players
York Revolution players